Fahmin Muradbayli (born 16 March 1996) is an Azerbaijani footballer who plays as a right winger for Neftçi Baku in the Azerbaijan Premier League.

Club career
On 22 May 2015, Muradbayli made his debut in the Azerbaijan Premier League for Neftçi Baku match against Baku.

Honours

Club
Neftçi
 Azerbaijan Cup: 2013–14

International
Azerbaijan U23
 Islamic Solidarity Games: (1) 2017

References

External links
 

1996 births
Living people
Association football midfielders
Azerbaijani footballers
Azerbaijan youth international footballers
Azerbaijan under-21 international footballers
Azerbaijan Premier League players
Neftçi PFK players
Sabail FK players